Cameron Station was the location of the Defense Logistics Agency in Alexandria, Virginia (as well as the smaller Defense Contract Audit Agency, until its closure by the 1988 Base Realignment and Closure Commission.The BRAC report can be found here.

References

Buildings and structures in Alexandria, Virginia
Military installations established in 1942
Military installations in Virginia
Military installations closed in 1995
Quartermasters